United Nations Security Council Resolution 2076 was unanimously adopted on 20 November 2012. The Security Council demanded the immediate withdrawal of the armed group known as the 23 March Movement (M23) from the major eastern Congolese city of Goma and the cessation of any further advances, calling for a clarification of reports of external support provided to the group and stating its readiness to act on the basis of information received.

See also 
List of United Nations Security Council Resolutions 2001 to 2100

References

External links
Text of the Resolution at undocs.org

2012 United Nations Security Council resolutions
United Nations Security Council resolutions concerning the Democratic Republic of the Congo
2012 in the Democratic Republic of the Congo
November 2012 events